Neutrons is a 1981 video game published by Level-10.

Gameplay
Neutrons is a game in which a neutron bounces off the walls, paddles, and bumpers in the game chamber where it is released, allowing it to accumulate points.

Reception
Rudy Kraft reviewed Neutrons in The Space Gamer No. 51. Kraft commented that "I cannot recommend this game under any circumstances.  Even the simplest version of Pong involves more skill and is a better game."

References

1981 video games
Apple II games
Apple II-only games
Level-10 games